San Narciso, officially the Municipality of San Narciso, is a 4th class municipality in the province of Zambales, Philippines. According to the 2020 census, it has a population of 30,759 people.

San Narciso is famous for its beaches along the South China Sea that are suited for surfing.

The Philippine Merchant Marine Academy or PMMA is located here. San Narciso also houses the Magsaysay Memorial College, which offers bachelors courses and other 2-year courses. Also located in San Narciso is the Zambales Academy, one of the oldest secondary education institution in the province, it is where former president Ramon Magsaysay took his secondary education.

History
The Municipality of San Narciso was founded in the early part of 18th century. The migrants from the Ilocandia arrived in the area and established their settlement in Alusiis which was the first name of the pueblo that later became San Narciso.

San Narcsio became the official name of the town by a Royal Decree issued by the Spanish Governor General Narciso Claveria and Archbishop Jose Soque on February 12, 1846.

The people of San Narciso participated in the Philippine Revolution against Spain. When the Katipunan was organized by Andres Bonifacio and sent his representatives in San Narciso, many prominent men of the town became members. Pantaleon Dumlao became the head of the local organization.

Geography
San Narciso is located in a relatively flat plain. West of the town is the South China Sea and to the east is bordered by the Sto. Tomas river are the Zambales Mountain Ranges.

Climate

San Narciso has a tropical monsoon climate (Am) with little to no rainfall from November to April and heavy to extremely heavy rainfall from May to October.

Barangays
San Narciso is subdivided into 17 barangays.

Demographics

Economy 

The town is mostly agricultural with most families owning farmland to plant rice and other crops such as string beans, onions and other vegetables.  Commerce is centered in the town center and the public market. There are also a number of poultry and pig farms in the municipality mostly located in the outskirts. In recent years, tourism has increased in the municipality. Due to its close proximity to Manila which is just a 3-hour drive away, many residents of the capital visit its beaches specially around summertime. This in effect has increased the economic activity in the municipality and have provided jobs and opportunities to its residents.

Culture
The first settlers of San Narciso came from Paoay, Ilocos Norte and Agno, Pangasinan which was then a part of Zambales. They brought forth with them customs and traditions such as honoring their dead thru prayers and novenas. Family members and relatives come together to offer prayers and recite names of deceased relatives. One unique part about these practices is the serving of food, usually pancit, puto and ginataang bilo-bilo or what locals call tambo-tambong. It is a local delicacy made from glutinous rice balls, cassava, banana, jackfruit, coconut milk and tapioca pearls.

Government

Municipal executives

Spanish regime

 1884			        Tomas Bernabe		Gobernadorcillo
 1886				Mariano Apolinario	Gobernadorcillo
 1887 				Paulo Fogata		Gobernadorcillo
 1888				Esteban Foton		Gobernadorcillo
 1889				Mariano Marañon		Gobernadorcillo
 1890				Francisco Fajarito	Gobernadorcillo
 1891				Gregorio Farañal	Gobernadorcillo
 1892				Leocadio Firme		Gobernadorcillo
 1893				Juan Flordeliza Dumlao	Gobernadorcillo
 1894				Quirico Amon Sr.	Gobernadorcillo
 1895				Luis Fogata		Gobernadorcillo
 1895				Cipriano Fogata		Gobernadorcillo

Revolutionary government
 1897			        Cipriano Fernandez	Capitan Municipal
 1898				Casamiro Amon		Capitan Municipal 1
 1900				Vicente Posadas		Capitan Municipal

American regime
 1903–1904			Simeon Marañon		Presidente Municipal
 1905–1906			Angel Dumlao		Presidente Municipal
 June 1906-Jan. 8, 1908	        Simeon Villanueva	Presidente Municipal
 June 9, 1908-Dec. 1909	        Angle Dumlao		Presidente Municipal
 1910–1912			Victor Amos		Presidente Municipal
 1912–1916			Mariano Villanueva	Presidente Municipal
 1916–1919			Marcos Fuerte		Presidente Municipal
 1919–1922			Severino Fuertes	Presidente Municipal
 1922–1925			Paulino Delos Santos	Presidente Municipal
 1926–1931			Esteban Florita		Presidente Municipal
 1932–1934			Donato Amon		Presidente Municipal

Commonwealth
 1934–1940			Ireneo Delos Reyes	Municipal Mayor
 1941-Oct. 1942		        Pacifico Fuerte		Municipal Mayor

Japanese Occupation
 Oct. 1942–1944		        Sebastian Fogata	Municipal Mayor

Liberation Military Government
 February 1945			Gerardo Evangelista	Municipal Mayor
 May 1945 – July 1946		Pacifico Fuerte		Municipal Mayor
 1947–1948			Severino Fuertes	Municipal Mayor

Republic of the Philippines
 Aug. 1948–1955		Sebastian Fogata		Municipal Mayor
 Jan. 1956–1960		Jose Delos Santos		Municipal Mayor
 Jan. 1960–1963		Sebastian Fogata		Municipal Mayor
 Jan. 1963–1986		Francisco A. Galvez, Jr.	Municipal Mayor
 1986–1989		Quirico F. Abrajano, Jr.	Municipal Mayor
 1989–1992		Francisco A. Galvez, Jr.	        Municipal Mayor
 1992–2001		Quirico F. Abrajano, Jr.	Municipal Mayor
 2001 – 2010		William T. Lim		        Municipal Mayor
 2010 - 2016 Peter T. Lim Municipal Mayor
 2016 to 2019 La Rainne Abad-Sarmiento Municipal Mayor
 2019 to 2022 William T. Lim Municipal Mayor
 2022 to present La Rainne Abad-Sarmiento Municipal Mayor

References
 7. https://pia.gov.ph/provinces/zambales

External links

San Narciso Profile at PhilAtlas.com
[ Philippine Standard Geographic Code]

Municipalities of Zambales
Surfing locations in the Philippines